Veloz may refer to:

People with the surname 
 Ermes Espinoza Veloz (born 1987), Cuban chess grandmaster
 Frank Veloz (1906–1981), American ballroom dancer. See Veloz and Yolanda
 Jean Veloz (1924-2023), American dancer and actress
 Juan Veloz (born 1982), Mexican swimmer
 Julissa Veloz (born 1988), American singer and musician

Vehicles 
 Toyota Veloz, a multi-purpose vehicle marketed by Toyota since 2021 as the successor to the Avanza Veloz (2011–2021)